Neptune is an Italian melodic death metal band from Verona, that was founded in 1999. Their influences are based upon melodic death metal acts such as; Hatesphere, In Flames, Soilwork, Dark Tranquillity, Disarmonia Mundi, At the Gates and The Haunted.

History
Formed in 1999 by Mattia Nidini (vocals), Andrea Mameli (guitar), Francesco Moro (guitar), Francesco Adami (bass) and Corrado Zoccatelli (drums), Neptune played death metal much akin to their influences of Dark Tranquility and In Flames. They released a three-song demo entitled Synthbreed in 2002 that received positive reviews from webzines and magazines. For two years, the band performed locally with their material and released Perfection and Failure in 2004.

In 2005, the band played at Metalcamp in Slovenia and was their first tour outside their country. In Summer 2006, the band started recording sessions with Disarmonia Mundi's Ettore Rigotti at Db Studios in Turin, Italy. When recording was completed, the band waited for a record deal and joined fellow Italian band Bleed in Vain for the Deathcore Smash Your Head Tour in their local city.

The band recently signed with Austrian label Noisehead Records for their debut album, Acts of Supremacy, produced by Ettore Rigotti. Their debut album, Acts of Supremacy, was released on April 11, 2008.

Band lineup

Current members 
 Mattia "Tia" Nidini − vocals
 Mattia Filippi − [guitars]
 Claudio Giacometti − [guitar]
 Francesco "Cesco" Adami − bass
 Corrado "Corradino" Zoccatelli − drums

Former members
 Luca "Tex" Tezza - guitar
 Mirko "Cape" Capellari - guitar
 Francesco "Kekko" Moro − guitar
 Andrea "Andrax" Mameli − guitar
 Aldo Colognato − guitar
 Alessio de Antoni − keyboards
 Andrea Pinamonte − bass

Discography
 Synthbreed (demo, 2002)
 Perfection and Failure (album, 2004)
 Acts of Supremacy (album, 2008)
 Prelude to Nothing (album, 2013)

External links
 Neptune official site
 Neptune's old official site
 Neptune official Myspace
 Neptune official YouTube

References

Italian melodic death metal musical groups
Musical groups established in 1999
Musical quintets
1999 establishments in Italy